Manno-ike Dam  is an earthfill dam located in Kagawa Prefecture in Japan. The dam is used for irrigation. The catchment area of the dam is 98.8 km2. The dam impounds about 139  ha of land when full and can store 15400 thousand cubic meters of water. The construction of the dam completed in 1959.

References 

Dams in Kagawa Prefecture
Dams completed in 1959